Tha Champi is a village and tambon (subdistrict) of Mueang Phayao District, in Phayao Province, Thailand. In 2005 it had a total population of 4100 people.

References

Tambon of Phayao province
Populated places in Phayao province